Mervyn LeRoy (October 15, 1900 – September 13, 1987) was an American film director and producer. In his youth he played juvenile roles in vaudeville and silent film comedies.

During the 1930s, LeRoy was one of the two great practitioners of economical and effective film directing at Warner Brothers studios, the other his cohort Michael Curtiz. LeRoy's most acclaimed films of his tenure at Warners include Little Caesar (1931), I Am a Fugitive From a Chain Gang (1932), Gold Diggers of 1933 (1933) and They Won't Forget (1937).

LeRoy left Warners and moved to Metro-Goldwyn-Mayer studios in 1939 to serve as both director and producer. Perhaps his most notable achievement as a producer is the 1939 classic The Wizard of Oz.

Early life 

LeRoy was born on October 15, 1900, in San Francisco, California, the only child of Edna (née Armer) and Harry LeRoy, a well-to-do department store owner. Both his parents' families had fully assimilated, residing in the Bay Area for several generations. LeRoy described his relatives as "San Franciscans first, Americans second, Jews third."

LeRoy's mother was a frequent attendee at San Francisco's premier vaudeville venues, the Orpheum and the Alcazar, often socializing with the theater's personnel. She arranged for the six-year-old LeRoy to serve as a Native-American papoose in the 1906 stage production of The Squaw Man. LeRoy attributed his early interest in vaudeville to "my mother's fascination with it" and to that of his cousins, Jesse L. Lasky and Blanche Lasky, vaudevillians during LeRoy's youth.

LeRoy's parents separated suddenly in 1905 for reasons that were not divulged to their son. They never reunited and his father Harry raised LeRoy as a single parent. His mother moved to Oakland, California with Percy Teeple, a travel agent and former journalist, who would later become LeRoy's stepfather after the death of Harry Leroy in 1916. LeRoy visited his mother as a child, regarding her more as "a grandparent or a favorite aunt."

The 1906 San Francisco earthquake and fire devastated the city when LeRoy was five-and-a-half years old. He was sleeping in his bed on the second floor when the quake struck in the early morning causing the house to collapse. Neither LeRoy nor his father suffered serious physical injury. His father's import-export store was completely destroyed. LeRoy retained vivid mental images of the city's devastation:

Reduced to virtual penury, father and son lived as displaced persons at the military-run tent city on the Presidio for the next six months. The elder LeRoy obtained work as a salesman for the Heinz Pickle Company, but his business losses had left him "a beaten man." The young LeRoy emerged from the traumatic event with a sense of pride that he had survived the ordeal and to regard it as fortuitous: "The big thing in my life was the earthquake...it changed my life before I knew I even had one."

At the age of twelve, with few prospects to acquire a formal education and his father financially strained, LeRoy became a newsboy and earned his first money. His father supported him in this endeavor. LeRoy hawked newspapers at iconic locations, including Chinatown, the Barbary Coast red-light district and Fisherman's Wharf, where he became educated as to the realities of life in the city:

Juvenile acts in vaudeville: 1914–1923 

Selling newspapers near the Alcazar Theatre, LeRoy was spotted by stage star Theodore Roberts. A personable and attractive youth at age fourteen, LeRoy was engaged for a bit part in a 1914 stage production of Barbara Frietchie. Gratified by "that lovely feeling—audience approval", he performed in productions with the Liberty Theater in Oakland, playing the lead juvenile roles in Tom Sawyer and Little Lord Fauntleroy.

Chaplin impersonator 

As a 14-year-old, LeRoy carefully observed emerging screen star Charlie Chaplin at a number of film sets in the greater San Francisco area. From these studies, LeRoy devised a burlesque of the comedian, and perfected his imitation on the local amateur circuit. In 1915 he won a competition that hosted almost a thousand Chaplin imitators at the Pantages Theater. His outstanding performance earned him a slot as "The Singing Newsboy" in Sid Grauman's vaudeville show at the Panama–Pacific International Exposition titled "Chinatown by Night".

In 1916 his father died, leaving the 15-year-old LeRoy responsible for providing his own financial support.

LeRoy and Cooper: "Two Kids and a Piano": 1916–1919 

Now a show-business professional, LeRoy left his newsboy job. Pairing with the 16-year-old actor-pianist Clyde Cooper, they formed a vaudeville routine "LeRoy and Cooper: Two Kids and a Piano." The duo struggled to find engagements, and LeRoy recalled "we would have played toilets if they had offered us some money." Soon they were discovered by the premier vaudeville circuits – Pantages, Gus Sun and Orpheum – and provided with regular bookings on national tours. LeRoy relished the lifestyle of a vaudevillian, occasionally appearing in shows that featured iconic performers of the era, among them Sarah Bernhardt, Harry Houdini and Jack Benny. After three years, and now "a fairly well-established act" in theater listings, the duo amicably disbanded after an unexpected death in Cooper's family.

LeRoy joined George Choos's mostly female troupe in musical comedies, and Gus Edwards act billed "The Nine Country Kids" in 1922. LeRoy's enthusiasm for the stage gradually waned and he left the troupe in 1923.

Early Hollywood career: technician and actor: 1919–1923 

LeRoy accepted a bit role in a scene with former The Perils of Pauline (1914) star Pearl White filmed at Fort Lee, New Jersey. LeRoy was "thoroughly intrigued" by the filmmaking process, recalling "I knew I was finished with vaudeville. I knew, just as positively that I wanted to get into the movie business."

In October 1919 LeRoy, just turned 19, approached his cousin Jesse L. Lasky, a former vaudevillian who was twenty years his senior. Lasky was a partner with rising movie moguls Samuel Goldwyn and Adolf Zukor at its New York headquarters at Famous Players-Lasky. Lasky furnished LeRoy with note to the employment department at their Hollywood studios. A week later LeRoy began working in the Wardrobe Unit folding costumes for the American Civil War picture Secret Service (1919), earning $12.50 a week.

According to film historian Kingley Canham, Leroy's "enthusiasm, energy and push", in addition to a further appeal to Jesse Lasky, earned LeRoy promotion to lab technician in the film tinting unit.

LeRoy's next advancement was achieved through his own initiative. Discovering that director William DeMille wished to create an illusion of moonlight shimmering on a lake to produce a romantic effect, LeRoy devised a technique in the lab:

Despite LeRoy suffering a stern reprimand, DeMille was delighted with the effect and used the footage in the film. LeRoy was immediately promoted to assistant cameraman.

After six months behind the camera, LeRoy experienced a disastrous contretemps when he improperly adjusted the camera focus settings, ruining footage on several scenes on a DeMille production. LeRoy describes it as "a horrible mess" which led to his dismissal in 1921 as cameraman.

LeRoy was soon hired as an extra on Cecil B. DeMille's 1923 epic The Ten Commandments LeRoy credits Cecil B. DeMille, for inspiring him to become a director: "As the top director of the era, DeMille had been the magnet that had drawn me to his set as often as I could go." LeRoy also credits DeMille for teaching him the directing techniques required to make his own films.

LeRoy worked intermittently in small supporting roles in film during the early 1920s.

Gag writer (comedy constructor) and Alfred E. Green, 1924–1926 

During the filming of The Ghost Breaker (1922), bit actor LeRoy suggested a number of humorous skits, which were incorporated into the picture by director Alfred E. Green. Green offered him a position as "gag man". LeRoy recalled:

While working at First National Pictures, LeRoy wrote gags for comedienne Colleen Moore in several films including Sally (1925), The Desert Flower (1925), We Moderns (1925) and Ella Cinders (1926). LeRoy served as acting advisor and confidant to Moore. In 1927 her husband John McCormick, studio head at First National in Hollywood, asked LeRoy to direct Moore in a version of Peg O' My Heart. When the project was cancelled studio president Richard A. Rowland, with Moore advocating, authorized LeRoy to direct a comedy, No Place to Go, starring Mary Astor and Lloyd Hughes and launching LeRoy's filmmaking career at age twenty-seven.

First National Pictures: transition to sound, 1927–1930 

His success with No Place to Go (1927), was followed by "a string of comedies and jazz-baby dramas" that served as vehicles for actress Alice White and allowed LeRoy to hone his skills as director. His prolific output in the final years of the silent film era included the box-office successes Harold Teen with Arthur Lake and Oh, Kay! with Colleen Moore.

Warner Brothers acquired First National in 1925 as a subsidiary studio and producer Jack Warner became a mentor and in-law to LeRoy in subsequent years.

LeRoy eagerly anticipated his first sound picture assignment, Naughty Baby (1929):

LeRoy's early directing efforts at First National were largely limited to comedies. His movies from this period include Gentleman's Fate (1931) with John Gilbert (filmed at M-G-M studios), Tonight or Never (1931), with Gloria Swanson, High Pressure, a proto-screwball comedy with William Powell and Evelyn Brent, and The Heart of New York (1932) with Joe Smith.

Warner Brothers: 1930–1939 

LeRoy embarked on a period of enormous productivity and inventiveness at Warner Studios, creating "some the most polished and ambitious" films of the Thirties. His only rival at Warner's was fellow director Michael Curtiz. Film historian John Baxter observes:

In the studio's competitive crucible produced by the Great Depression demanding profitable entertainment, LeRoy directed 36 pictures during the decade (Curtiz filmed an astounding 44 features during the same period). Baxter adds: "No genius could function without variation under such pressure." The social perspective of films favored at Warner Brothers was distinct from those of its chief rivals: Metro-Goldwyn-Mayer (M-G-M), uncontested for its "technical virtuosity" aimed to serve "middle-class tastes" and Paramount studios identified for its "sophisticated dialogue and baroque settings" that catered to European sensibilities. In contrast, Warner Brothers films carried themes appealing to the working classes.
Leroy biographer Kingsley Canham writes:

LeRoy's output in the early thirties was prodigious. The director attests to the rate of film production at the studios:

LeRoy admits in retrospect that "I shot them so often and so fast that they tend to blend together in my memory."

LeRoy's social realism mocked corrupt politicians, bankers and the idle rich, while celebrating the Depression Era experiences of "hard-working chorus girls...taxi-drivers and bell-hops struggling to make ends meet in the brawl of New York...gloss and polish were considered useless affectation."

Gangster genre: Little Caesar, 1930 

LeRoy first departed from his comedy-romance themed films with his drama Numbered Men (1930), a character study of convicts shot on location at San Quentin prison. The depiction of criminal elements had enjoyed popularity with Josef von Sternberg's silent classic Underworld (1927), a fantasy treatment of his lone Byronic gangster "Bull" Weed. The gangster film as a genre was not achieved until LeRoy's 1930 Little Caesar, starring Edward G. Robinson, the first time that "any real attempt was made by Hollywood to describe the brutal reality of the criminal world."

LeRoy's Little Caesar established the iconography of subsequent films on organized crime, emphasizing the hierarchy of family loyalties and the function of violence in advancing criminal careers. LeRoy's adroit cinematic handling of Robinson's Rico incrementally shifts initial audience response from revulsion at the character's homicidal acts to a "grudging admiration" that provides for a measure of sympathy when the gangster meets his sordid death in a back alley. LeRoy recalled the topicality of his subject in 1930: "Al Capone was a household word and the Saint Valentine's Day Massacre had happened only a year before."

LeRoy further demonstrated his talent for delivering fast-paced and competently executed social commentary and entertainment with Five Star Final (1931), an exposé of tabloid journalism, and Two Seconds (1932), a "vicious and disenchanted" cautionary tale of a death row inmate, each starring Robinson.

I Am a Fugitive from a Chain Gang (1932) 

Warner Brothers' most explosive social critique of the 1930s appeared with LeRoy's I Am a Fugitive from a Chain Gang, dramatizing the harsh penal codes in Georgia and starring Paul Muni as the hunted fugitive James Allen.

Historian John Baxter observes that "no director has managed to close his film on so cold a note as LeRoy." Muni's escaped convict, falsely condemned to hard labor, is reduced to furtive prey: Asked by his estranged sweetheart "how do you get along, how do you live?" he hisses "I steal" and retreats into the night.
Muni continued to work effectively with LeRoy in The World Changes (1933) with Aline MacMahon and in Hi, Nellie! (1934) with Glenda Farrell.

The versatile LeRoy portrayed both hard-boiled and clownish characters at Warner Brothers. His Hard to Handle (1933), James Cagney plays a fast-talking and remorselessly unscrupulous con-man, often to comic effect. His 1933 pictures Tugboat Annie (with LeRoy on loan to M-G-M), with Marie Dressler and Elmer, the Great, the final of three pictures that LeRoy made with comic Joe E. Brown, stand in contrast with the director's gangster melodramas.

LeRoy's socially-themed narrative is evident in his Three on a Match (1932) which follows the fates of three young women: a stenographer, a showgirl and a socialite played by Bette Davis, Joan Blondell and Ann Dvorak, respectively. His adroit transitions and cross-cutting provide quick and effective insights into his characters' social rise and fall. The "pitiless mileau of grimy backstreets and cheap motels" serve as an implicit social critique without making this the theme of the picture.

The Gold Diggers of 1933 (1933) 

The musical Gold Diggers of 1933 is one of the outstanding examples of the genre released by Warner Brothers in the Thirties. While the dance stagings—"surreal, geometric, often erotically charged" by choreographer Busby Berkeley dominate the picture, Warner's musicals, according to historian John Baxter "are distinguished enough to be worth considering outside any discussion of Berkeley's dance direction. The Gold Diggers of 1933 certainly deserves such attention." Offering more than mere depression era escapism, the musical depicts the mass unemployment of veterans of World War I and alludes to the recent Washington D.C. Bonus Army protests, violently suppressed by police and U.S. Army units. The movie closes with the "dark and pessimistic" number "Remember My Forgotten Man".

LeRoy's control of the comedic elements and his direction of a cast endowed with "hard-boiled" heroines Ruby Keeler, Joan Blondell, Aline MacMahon and Ginger Rogers, would provide stand alone entertainment even if unencumbered by Berkeley's choreographed numbers. MacMahon, who plays the "ruthless" Trixie was later cast in the lead for LeRoy's dramatic Heat Lightning (1934) as a murderess. a picture which prefigures director Archie Mayo's The Petrified Forest (1936).

LeRoy followed with musical-like comedies for Warners in 1934 Happiness Ahead with Dick Powell and Josephine Hutchinson, about a society heiress who woos a window washer.

Oil for the Lamps of China (1935) 

Oil for the Lamps of China, an adaption of the Alice Tisdale Hobart novel, is an examination of an American oil company in China, centering on its paternalistic and humiliating treatment of an ambitious company man played by Pat O'Brien. Josephine Hutchinson portrays his long-suffering wife. LeRoy effectively employed cinematic techniques of montage, structural parallels in settings, chiaroscuro lighting and musical leitmotifs to develop atmosphere and convey O'Brien's struggle, ending in his vindication.

LeRoy returned to light comedy and romance in 1935 with a film adaption of the 1929 Jerome Kern and Oscar Hammerstein II stage production of the same name starring Irene Dunne.
and a Marion Davies vehicle Page Miss Glory (filmed at Hearst's Cosmopolitan Pictures) and I Found Stella Parish, with a sentimental "tour-de-force" performance by Kay Francis.

Anthony Adverse (1936) 

Based on the popular twelve-hundred page historical romance by Hervey Allen, Warner's Anthony Adverse (1936) was LeRoy's most prestigious undertaking to date. Only two-thirds of the vast and unwieldy picaresque tale, set during the Napoleonic era, is depicted onscreen (a sequel was planned but abandoned). The sheer scale of the project remains impressive, and Leroy's ability to handle a film with high production values that possessed a "Metro-like glossiness" recommended him to Metro-Goldwyn-Mayer as a prospective executive producer.

The "lively performances" from a large cast including Fredric March, Olivia de Havilland, Claude Rains, Anita Louise and Gale Sondergaard, as well as LeRoy's "technical excellence" was rewarded with five academy award nominations.

LeRoy reports in his 1974 memoir that "by the time 1936 arrived, I was slowing my pace somewhat. Gone were the assembly-line tactics, the grinding-them-out methods of a few years before...I was working slower, trying to achieve more beauty on film, looking for cinematic perfection."

Producer-Director at Warner Brothers: 1936–1938 

In 1936, Warners began tasking LeRoy with both directing and producing assignments. LeRoy served as producer-director on Three Men on a Horse (1936), a "madcap" comedy starring Frank McHugh and a screenplay co-written by Groucho Marx. This was followed in 1937 with The King and the Chorus Girl, starring French actor Fernand Gravet . Both films costarred Joan Blondell.

Leroy also produced director James Whale's The Great Garrick (1937), a historical comedy with Brian Aherne who plays the renowned English actor.

They Won't Forget (1937) 

LeRoy's penultimate film for Warners was They Won't Forget (1937), a harsh indictment of lynch law based on the Ward Greene novel, Death in the Deep South (1936). According to critic Kingsley Canham, LeRoy's handling of tracking and low-angle shots, overhead composition, close-ups and dissolves possess a "visual power" that "retains its impact for modern audiences." LeRoy's unmitigated condemnation of lynching rejects misanthropy and adopts a tone of "righteous anger", in which there "is no forgiveness" for the instigators of mob law.

LeRoy was poised to move to M-G-M as head of production in 1938, with the fulsome support of the studio's Louis B. Mayer where "[LeRoy] would establish himself as a major force in Forties cinema." Before departing Warners, Leroy directed and produced his final film Fools for Scandal (1938), the studio's second – and failed attempt – to launch the American film career of French actor Fernand Gravet. Comedienne Carol Lombard costars.

Interlude as producer: M-G-M: 1938–1939 

LeRoy arrived at M-G-M fully expecting to finish his career as the studio's chief production executive. His first assignments were modest:

Dramatic School (1938) directed by Robert B. Sinclair: A romantic drama starring Luise Rainer and Paulette Goddard and LeRoy's first picture at M-G-M. Biographer John Baxter attributes Rainer's "coherent, moving and truthful" performance to producer LeRoy and "a fitting to [the filmmakers] rich Thirties career."

Stand Up and Fight (1938), directed by W. S. Van Dyke: A Wallace Beery vehicle, with costars Robert Taylor and Florence Rice. The screenplay was co-written by crime fiction writer James M. Cain, and Jane Murfin, who wrote the adaption of Booth Tarkington's novel the Katharine Hepburn vehicle Alice Adams (1935).

At the Circus (1938) directed by Edward Buzzell: A Marx Brothers comedy.

Leroy's last picture as M-G-M's production executive was an adaption of L. Frank Baum's children's book The Wizard of Oz.

The Wizard of Oz (1939): Magnum opus production 

In 1938, LeRoy proposed a film version of The Wonderful Wizard of Oz (1900). Louis B. Mayer purchased the rights to the property from Samuel Goldwyn for $50,000. Mayer limited LeRoy's role to producer and ultimately Victor Fleming was enlisted as credited director. LeRoy recalled the scope of the project:

LeRoy added that "it took six months to prepare the picture, six months to shoot it, and then a lengthy post-production schedule for editing and scoring. Altogether The Wizard of Oz was many months in the making..."

Though LeRoy was earning $3000 week ($600,000 per year), after completing The Wizard of Oz, he requested a release from his contract so as to return to directing, and Mayer complied:

LeRoy accepted a cut in salary to $4000 a week as a director at M-G-M and "never again functioned only as a producer."

Director at M-G-M: 1940–1949 

The onset of war in Europe in 1939 created anxiety in the Hollywood film industry as the overseas movie market contracted and currency restrictions mounted in Great Britain. Hollywood studios implemented salary reductions and limits on film content were imposed, particularly at M-G-M. Film historians Charles Higham and Joel Greenberg describe these developments persisting "almost to the end of the decade":

Critic Andrew Sarris disparages the "sentimental piety and conformist cant" that characterized M-G-M studios, as well as Warner Brothers in Hollywood's Golden Age

LeRoy limited himself to directing features at M-G-M for the next 9 years, delivering 11 pictures. The quality of his output during this period is generally viewed as a decline creatively compared to his early work at Warner Brothers during the Thirties.

He resumed directorial duties with an adaption of Robert E. Sherwood's romantic play Waterloo Bridge (1930).

Waterloo Bridge (1940) 

Metro-Goldwyn-Mayer purchased the rights to Waterloo Bridge from Universal Studios, which had produced an adaption filmed in 1931 by James Whale and starring Mae Clarke as the fallen woman, Myra.

LeRoy's Waterloo Bridge (1940), served as a vehicle to capitalize upon the meteoric rise of Vivien Leigh, heroine of David O. Selznick's epic Gone with the Wind (1939). In a period when foreign markets were in jeopardy, profitable films were at a premium.

A silent film era technician and director in his early Hollywood career, LeRoy utilized silent film methods to film a key nightclub love scene with Leigh and costar Robert Taylor. LeRoy describes his epiphany:

LeRoy directed Robert Taylor, Norma Shearer and Conrad Veidt in the 1940 Escape, the first of a number of anti-Nazi features suppressed by Hitler and which ultimately led to the banning of all M-G-M pictures in Germany.

The Greer Garson pictures 

LeRoy completed four features with English actress Greer Garson, an enormously profitable property cultivated by M-G-M to appeal to their British markets during WWII.

Blossoms in the Dust (1941): The screenplay by Anita Loos portrays the struggle by social reformer Edna Gladney to redeem children stigmatized by illegitimacy. Termed "highly romanticized" and "shamelessly sentimental" by film historian Kingley Canham, LeRoy defended the picture as virtuous and socially significant:

The pairing of Garson with Walter Pidgeon proved particularly appealing to their fans. They would appear together in a number of pictures, including LeRoy's 1943 biopic of Madame Curie.

As Leroy's first color film, Blossoms in the Dust demonstrates an aesthetically pleasing and an adroit handling of the new Technicolor technology.

Random Harvest (1942): Leroy and producer Sydney Franklin paired Garson with fellow Briton Ronald Colman in a romance that dramatizes clinical amnesia suffered by a WWI combat veteran. Garson's genteel and largely desexualized screen image – "M-G-M's First Lady of Saintly Virtue" – favored by Louis B. Mayer, is countered by LeRoy's less inhibited Garson as the "impulsive Scottish lass" Paula.

LeRoy's leisurely narrative pace, the lavishness of the settings, the fulsome musical score and the balanced editing demonstrate his embrace of M-G-M production values and distinguishing the stylish Random Harvest from his work at Warner Brothers.

Madame Curie (1943): Apropos LeRoy's "lavish and lengthy biography" portraying the Nobel prize-winning scientist Marie Curie, critics Higham and Greenberg make these observations:

LeRoy and producer Sydney Franklin made a genuine effort to make the "highbrow" subject of the film – the heroic discovery of radium isotopes – engaging to the public, resorting to romanticizing and simplifying the topic.

Madame Curie was one of nine pictures in which Garson was cast with leading man Pidgeon. Married to Buddy Fogelson, Garson earned the title "the daytime Mrs. Pidgeon" on M-G-M sets.

Desire Me (1946): LeRoy attempted to reshoot an uncompleted George Cukor project starring Garson and Robert Mitchum, Desire Me, but abandoned the film, disparaging the "rotten script, a script that made absolutely no sense.". Neither Cukor nor LeRoy appeared in the credits.

Strange Lady in Town (1955): LeRoy's first film after returning to Warner Brothers studios as a director-producer. Garson, passed over by M-G-M to star as opera diva Marjorie Lawrence in Interrupted Melody (1955), signed with Warners to make Strange Lady in Town, a western set in Santa Fe, New Mexico and endowed to Garson's satisfaction "with horses and sunsets." Dana Andrews co-stars.

Wartime propaganda: 1944–1945 

In the final years of World War II, LeRoy directed propaganda films dramatizing the American war efforts at home and overseas.

Thirty Seconds Over Tokyo (1944) recounts the 1942 U.S. bombing mission over Tokyo by sixteen B-25s, coordinated by Lieutenant-Colonel James H. Doolittle (played by Spencer Tracy). LeRoy employs flashbacks in an effort to present the personal lives of the airmen and their spouses, including an emotionally wrought scene in which the wounded Lieutenant Ted W. Lawson (played by Van Johnson) has his leg amputated.

Conceived as a morale-builder for the homefront, Thirty Seconds Over Tokyo, with a script written by Dalton Trumbo "lacks the scope and organization" and compares unfavorably to director John Cromwell's 1943 Since You Went Away according to critic Kingsley Canham. The rescue sequences of the downed American flyers' by Chinese guerrillas was designed "to foster closer relations 'between the American People and their courageous Chinese allies'" and includes a scene with Chinese children at a mission hospital honoring the airmen with a rendition of Katherine Lee Bates' patriotic anthem America the Beautiful.

The House I Live In (1945), Documentary short: LeRoy reports in his memoir Take One that Frank Sinatra approached him in 1945 with the idea of making a short movie version based on the song by Abel Meeropol The House I Live In. LeRoy thought it a worthy project and "a good thing to do during the wartime years." The script was written by Albert Maltz and produced by Frank Ross and Leroy, who also directed.

The House I Live In garnered LeRoy a special Oscar for his role as producer in the short film, the only Academy Award he would ever receive. In appreciation for LeRoy's contributions to The House I Live In, Frank Sinatra presented him with a medallion bearing the Jewish Star of David on one side and a Saint Christopher medal on the obverse.

Postwar Hollywood in the 1940s 

The Hollywood film industry reached its zenith in productivity, profitability, and popularity at the end of World War II. The studios collectively enjoyed their most lucrative year in 1946, with gross earnings reaching 1.75 billion dollars. In the closing years of the decade, organized labor won wage increases of 25% through protracted strikes. Overseas markets imposed substantial taxes on Hollywood films. Studios reacted by cutting expenses on film production and ordering mass layoffs. Historians Higham and Greenberg describe the qualitative impact on Hollywood films:

The formerly "glossy" productions were often replaced with lower budget black-and-white films, employing smaller casts and using indoor stages, rather than expensive on location sites.

Compounding the financial crisis was the Red Scare launched against purported Communist influence in Hollywood. The leading studio executives expelled many of the most talented figures in collaboration with House Un-American Activities Committee (HUAC). Accused of introducing Communist content into productions, the departure of Leftist screenwriters, directors and actors removed a creative element that had for years contributed to the high calibre and profitability of Hollywood pictures. These purgings were considered, in some financial circles and the anti-Communist establishment, a necessary corrective to labor militancy in the industry: "To some observers, [the blacklist] represented a long overdue housecleaning process; to others it meant the beginning of an era of fear, betrayal and witch-hunting hysteria."

Leroy reflected on the Red Scare in his 1974 memoir:

By the close of the Forties, the drain of artistic talent, the emerging television industry, and litigation that led to the weakening of studio monopolies destabilized the film industry, initiating a decline in the heretofore unlimited power and profitability of the Hollywood movie empire.

Comedies, melodramas and a literary remake: 1946–1950 

Without Reservations (1946): LeRoy's post-war pictures began with a Claudette Colbert vehicle (reminiscent of her role in It Happened One Night (1934)), with John Wayne as "Rusty" in an uncharacteristic romantic-comedic role. Colbert, as "Kit", utters the memorable and mildly impious phrase "Thanks, God. I'll take it from here". This is also the title of the book, by Jane Allen and Mae Livingston on which the movie is based.

Homecoming (1948): Like director William Wyler's 1946 The Best Years of Our Lives, LeRoy's Homecoming dramatizes an ex-servicemen's readjustment to civilian life. The gravity of the treatment is established in the title of Sidney Kingsley novel on which the film is based, The Homecoming of Ulysses (1944), invoking Homer's ancient Greek epic. Clark Gable plays Ulysses "Lee" Johnson, a recently discharged war surgeon whose self-complacency is shaken by his personal and professional combat experiences, softening his misanthropy and easing a nexus with his estranged wife. Anne Baxter. In the third of her three film pairings with Gable, Lane Turner plays an "uncharacteristically unglamorous" Lt. Jane "Snapshot" McCall.

Little Women: One of several film adaptations of Louisa May Alcott's Civil War era literary classic. The M-G-M Technicolor production offers "a picture postcard prettiness" in lieu of credible performances by June Allyson, Janet Leigh, Elizabeth Taylor and Margaret O'Brien.

Any Number Can Play (1949): Based on an Edward Harris Heth novel, the film describes the personal and professional crisis of a casino owner of high rectitude Clark Gable who also plays for high stakes, with his family relations in the balance. LeRoy was perplexed that the compelling screenplay by Richard Brooks and excellent performances delivered by Gable and Alexis Smith did not register at the box-office. LeRoy reflected on the picture: "I don't know what went wrong. You start out with what you think is a good script and you get a good cast...[but] you end up with a film that is less than you expect. Something happened or, more likely, something didn't happen – the chemistry didn't work and the emotions didn't explode. Whatever the reason, Any Number Can Play was a disappointment to me."

East Side, West Side (1949): A "dramatic social melodrama", the east-side, west-side refers to the class differences that define and divide the "superlative cast" in this M-G-M "high gloss" production. Barbara Stanwyck, plays the betrayed spouse, supported by co-stars James Mason, Ava Gardner and Van Heflin.

Quo Vadis (1951): Biblical spectacle 

Metro-Goldwyn-Mayer's Quo Vadis (1950) dramatizes an episode in the apocrypha Acts of Peter. The Latin title translates as "Where are you going?", adapted from a novel by Nobel Laureate author Henryk Sienkiewicz.

LeRoy's recognized that the Hollywood film industry would be best served by "accommodating" the emerging popularity of television, envisioning a division of mass entertainment function: TV would do small scale, low-budget productions dealing with "intimate things", while the motion picture studios would provide "the bigger, broader type of film." LeRoy's turn to "gigantic spectacle" coincided with the early onset of Hollywood's relative decline, as described by film historians Charles Higham and Joel Greenberg:

Logistically, Quo Vadis presented an "enormity." Filmed at the Cinecittà Studios in Rome, the production required the mobilization of tens-of thousands of extras, over nine months of shooting and an immense financial risk for M-G-M.

The huge investment in time and money paid off: Second only to Gone with the Wind (1939) in gross earnings, Quo Vadis garnered eight Academy Award nominations in 1952.

Leroy welcomed the services of an American Jesuit priest assigned to act as a technical advisor on the production. The director was granted a personal audience with Pope Pius XII and upon LeRoy's request, the Pope blessed the script of Quo Vadis.

Musicals and romantic comedies: 1952–1954 

In the aftermath of his successful epic Quo Vadis, LeRoy turned away from spectacles to lighter productions:

Lovely to Look At (1952): A re-make of the 1935 Astaire-Rogers musical scored by Jerome Kern, Roberta, directed by William A. Seiter. Vincente Minnelli organized the extravagant fashion show finale, with costumes by Adrian

Million Dollar Mermaid (1952): An aquatic-themed biopic loosely based on the life of Australian swimmer Annette Kellerman, portrayed by Esther Williams and aided by LeRoy's "competent direction." Busby Berkeley stages his lavishly produced underwater Oyster ballet.

Latin Lovers (1953): A romantic musical comedy starring Lana Turner and Ricardo Montalbán.

Rose Marie (1954): An adaption of a stage operetta by Otto Harbach and previously filmed by M-G-M in silent and sound versions, the Leroy adaption starred Ann Blyth and Howard Keel.<ref>Barson, 2020: "Rose Marie (1954) was another inferior remake of a 1930s classic."Passafiume, 2011. TCM: "Rose Marie was based on the famous stage operetta originally written by Otto Harbach, Oscar Hammerstein II and Rudolf Friml that was first produced for the New York stage in 1924. The story had already been filmed twice before at MGM, both times to great success. The 1928 silent version featured Joan Crawford in the title role, and the 1936 version starred Nelson Eddy and Jeanette MacDonald."Canham, 1976 p. 161: "LeRoy must take some blame for [Lovely To Look At and Rose Marie], although they reflect the gulf between the major companies and their audiences that characterized American films in the post-war period."</re And p. 185: "...LeRoy's farewell to M-G-M...</ref> his final effort with M-G-M before he returned to Warner Brothers.

LeRoy attributes his disaffection from M-G-M to a professional incompatibility with Dore Schary, who had recently replaced Louis B. Mayer as head of production: "[Schary] and I never really did see eye-to-eye on most things...since he was then running the studio, it didn't seem to make much sense for me to stick around."

Warner Brothers redux: 1955–1959 

After completing his last production featuring Greer Garson in Strange Lady in Town (1955), LeRoy turned largely to adapting Broadway successes, serving as producer and director and often enlisting casts from the original stage productions.

Mister Roberts (1955) 

Warners tasked LeRoy and Joshua Logan with completing Mister Roberts after the original director John Ford was hospitalized with a gallbladder disorder and removed from the production. Ford's departure and substitution proved to be fortuitous. Henry Fonda, who played the lead character, was a screen star in several Ford pictures as well as the lead actor in the highly acclaimed Mister Roberts) 1948 Broadway production, was at odds with Ford's film adaptation: the two engaged in a demoralizing contretemps that threatened to undermine the project.

Mister Roberts enjoyed immense popular and financial film success for Warners and earned supporting actor Jack Lemmon his first Oscar.

Return to director-producer 

LeRoy assumed the dual role of director-producer in the late Fifties and Sixties- the declining period of the Hollywood Golden Age, primarily serving at Warner Studios, but also 20th Century Fox, Columbia and Universal. Critic Kingsley Canham offers the following appraisal of LeRoy's work in this period:

 Despite these developments, LeRoy remained a profitable asset in the film industry.

The Bad Seed (1956): The film is based on a story by William March about a disturbed eleven-year-old girl whose murderous behavior is credited to her genetic heritage: she is the granddaughter of a notorious serial killer. Maxwell Anderson's 1954 stage production enjoyed success and Leroy imported most of the cast for his film adaption, including child actor Patty McCormick. The Motion Picture Production Code required that the child murderess perish for her crimes, and LeRoy dispatches her with a lightning bolt. Leroy recounts his struggle with censors:

The highly profitable Bad Seed garnered Academy Award nominations for several of the principal cast and cinematographer Harold Rosson.

Toward the Unknown (1956): A sympathetic dramatization post-Korean War of a former Korean war POW William Holden, who struggles to recover from post traumatic stress disorder (PTSD) and return to service as a test pilot in the U.S. Air Force.

No Time for Sergeants (1958): Novelist Mac Hyman's hillbilly protagonist Will Stockdale gained popularity in comic book form and was adapted to the stage by Ira Levin. Andy Griffith played the lead and Nick Adams his sidekick in LeRoy's film adaption.

Home Before Dark (1958): Based on a story and screenplay by Robert and Eileen Bassing, LeRoy examines the struggle of a former mental patient (Jean Simmons) to normalize her relationships with her husband (Dan O'Herlihy) who she suspects of having an affair with her half-sister (Rhonda Fleming).

The FBI Story (1959): A hagiographic review of federal law enforcement figure Chip Hardesty, vetted by the LeRoy's close personal friend and FBI director J. Edgar Hoover and starring James Stewart. For his services in directing and producing The FBI Story, the agency honored LeRoy with its Distinguished Service Award.

Wake Me When It's Over (1960), 20th Century Fox: A comedy-of-errors involving the appropriation of post-WWII era army surplus to build a resort on a remote Japanese island occupied by US troops. Starring Ernie Kovacs and Dick Shawn.

The Devil at 4 O'Clock (1961), Columbia Pictures: A priest (Spencer Tracy) and a convict (Frank Sinatra) join forces to rescue children from a leper colony when a volcano eruption threatens their Polynesian island.

A Majority of One (1961): Warner Brothers: An adaption of the successful Leonard Spigelgass play directed by Dore Schary. Stage actors Gertrude Berg and Cedric Hardwicke were replaced by producer Jack L. Warner with film stars Rosalind Russell and Alec Guinness as the romantic leads, set in Japan.

Gypsy (1962), Warner Brothers: LeRoy returned to musicals with a portrayal of the young Gypsy Rose Lee in her early career as a burlesque stripper, played by Natalie Wood and Rosalind Russell as her domineering stage mother.

Moment to Moment (1965), Universal: LeRoy's last credited directorial effort, Moment to Moment starring Jean Seberg and Honor Blackman.

Following Moment to Moment, disputes with Universal production head Edward Muhl over studio-proposed screenplays led to Leroy's return to Warner Brothers under Jack Warner's auspices. There he embarked on several projects, including preproduction for an adaption of James Thurber's The 13 Clocks, a tale that Leroy believed "had the makings of another The Wizard of Oz." When Warners was purchased by The McKinney Company, executives cancelled the project and Leroy quit the studio.

The Green Berets (1968): Uncredited advisor 

LeRoy served for over five months as an uncredited advisor on the 1968 The Green Berets, co-directed by Ray Kellogg and John Wayne and based on Robin Moore's 1965 collection of short stories.

The studio producing The Green Berets, Seven Arts, after recently acquiring Warners, were concerned that Wayne's dual role as actor-director was beyond his abilities. LeRoy describes his enlistment in the project and the suggests the extent of his contribution:

Leroy added that he "was on the picture for five and a half months...I didn't do it for nothing of course, but I wouldn't let them put my name on it, as I didn't think that would be fair to Duke." LeRoy retired from Warners-Seven Arts shortly after completing The Green Berets, representing his directorial swan song.

LeRoy received an honorary Oscar in 1946 for The House I Live In, "for tolerance short subject", and the Irving G. Thalberg Memorial Award in 1976.

A total of eight movies Mervyn LeRoy directed or co-directed were nominated for Best Picture at the Oscars, one of the highest numbers among all directors.

On February 8, 1960, he received a star on the Hollywood Walk of Fame at 1560 Vine Street, for his contributions to the motion pictures industry.

Casting discoveries 

LeRoy has been credited with launching or advancing the careers of numerous actors in Hollywood films when he served as director or producer at Warner Brothers and Metro-Goldwyn-Mayer studios. Biographer Kingsley Canham makes these observations:

Loretta Young: LeRoy's discovery of Loretta Young (then Gretchen Young) presents at least two distinct origin tales: Ronald L. Bowers in Film Review [April 1969]) reported that Leroy had directly solicited the 13-year-old Young in 1926 to play a juvenile part in Naughty but Nice (1927), a Colleen Moore vehicle for which Young received $80.00.

LeRoy, in his memoir Take One, offers a variation of this origin story: In 1930, Leroy reports that he recruited Young through the auspices of her mother. Leroy needed a leading lady to play opposite Grant Withers in Too Young to Marry (1931). Young's older half-sister (stage name Sally Blane) was engaged on another film, and her mother offered the younger daughter, Gretchen, as a substitute. LeRoy agreed, but changed her name to Loretta.

Clark Gable: Warner Brothers studio cast Edward G. Robinson in the role of gangster Rico Bandello in Little Caesar (1930), but Leroy was anxious to cast the part of racketeer Joe Masara. Rejecting Warners offer of Douglas Fairbanks, Jr., LeRoy spotted Gable in a touring production of The Last Mile at the Majestic Theatre in Los Angeles in the role of Killer Mears, and arranged a screen test with the stage actor. Pleased with the results, LeRoy championed Gable to producers Darryl Zanuck and Jack L. Warner for the part: they emphatically rejected the prospect, objecting to his relatively large ears. LeRoy declined the opportunity to sign Gable in a personal contract, which he would later regret. Despite this, Gable credited LeRoy for elevating his prospects in Hollywood: "He always gave me credit for discovering him." As Leroy shared in an interview with John Gillett in 1970: "I always tried to help young players- Clark Gable would have been in Little Caesar, but the front office thought his ears were too big."

Jane Wyman: LeRoy claims Wyman as one of his discoveries, though she had already been signed by Jack L. Warner at the age of 16, though not yet cast in a production. She was selected by LeRoy to play a bit part in his 1933 Elmer, the Great. LeRoy recalled his first encounter with the actress:

Lana Turner: At age fifteen, the then Judy Turner was auditioned by LeRoy in his effort to cast an actor to play Mary Clay in the 1937 social drama They Won't Forget. According to LeRoy's recollections, Turner was introduced to him as a prospect by Warner Brothers casting director Solly Baianno. LeRoy changed her name to Lana (pronounced LAW-nuh) Turner and personally groomed Turner for stardom. Leroy would also direct Turner in his 1948 Homecoming co-starring Clark Gable.

Audrey Hepburn: During casting for M-G-M's 1950 biblical epic Quo Vadis LeRoy sought an unknown actress for the role of Lygia, the young Christian loved by centurion Marcus Vinicius, played by (Robert Taylor). Audrey Hepburn was among hundreds of aspirants who were tested for the part. LeRoy reports in his memoir that he personally championed Hepburn as a "sensational" pick for the role, but the studio declined.

Robert Mitchum: LeRoy singled out 27-year-old Mitchum among the extras during the shooting of Thirty Seconds Over Tokyo (1944), casting him to play one of the crew of the "Ruptured Duck", a B-25 bomber. This was Mitchum's first role on screen, but M-G-M declined to sign him, despite LeRoy's urging. Mitchum starred with Greer Garson in Desire Me (1947), for which LeRoy's directorial contribution went uncredited.

Sophia Loren: According to LeRoy, actress Sophia Loren credits him with launching her film career. LeRoy had noticed the 16-year-old Loren among the extras assembled for a crowd scene in Quo Vadis, placing her in a prominent position where his cameras would "pick up this tall, Italian dark-eyed beauty." Years later, Loren personally thanked him: "My Mother and I needed the money and you hired us. None of [my film career] would have happened except for you."

Personal life 
LeRoy married three times and had many relationships with Hollywood actresses. He was first married to Elizabeth Edna Murphy in 1927, which ended in divorce in 1933. During their separation, LeRoy dated Ginger Rogers, but they ended the relationship and stayed lifelong friends. In 1934, he married Doris Warner, the daughter of Warner Bros. founder, Harry Warner. The couple had one son, Warner LeRoy and one daughter, Linda LeRoy Janklow, who is married to Morton L. Janklow. His son, Warner LeRoy, became a restaurateur. The marriage ended in divorce in 1942. In 1946, he married Kathryn "Kitty" Priest Rand, who had been previously married to Sidney M. Spiegel (the co-founder of Essaness Theatres and grandson of Joseph Spiegel); and to restaurateur Ernie Byfield. They remained married until his death. LeRoy also sold his Bel Air, Los Angeles, home to Johnny Carson.

Other interests 
A fan of thoroughbred horse racing, Mervyn LeRoy was a founding member of the Hollywood Turf Club, operator of the Hollywood Park Racetrack and a member of the track's board of directors from 1941 until his death in 1987. In partnership with father-in-law, Harry Warner, he operated a racing stable, W-L Ranch Co., during the 1940s/50s.

Death 

After being bed ridden for six months, LeRoy died of heart issues complicated by Alzheimer's disease in Beverly Hills, California on September 13, 1987, at the age of 86. He was interred in the Forest Lawn Memorial Park Cemetery in Glendale, California.

Film chronology

Silent Era

Actor: 1920–1924

Writer (comedies): 1924–1926

Director

Sound Era

Producer

Uncredited contributions

Footnotes

References 

Arnold, Jeremy. 2012. Strange Lady in Town. Turner Classic Movies. https://www.tcm.com/tcmdb/title/91603/strange-lady-in-town#articles-reviews?articleId=569780 Retrieved December 24, 2020.
Arnold, Jeremy. 2004. Any Number Can Play. Turner Classic Movies. https://www.tcm.com/tcmdb/title/1975/any-number-can-play/#articles-reviews?articleId=83983 Retrieved December 26, 2020.
Axmaker, Sean. 2014. Hi, Nellie! Turner Classic Movies. https://www.tcm.com/tcmdb/title/77918/hi-nellie#articles-reviews?articleId=1008239 Retrieved December 12, 2020.
Baxter, John. 1970. Hollywood in the Thirties. International Film Guide Series. Paperback Library, New York. LOC Card Number 68-24003.
 Baxter, John. 1971. The Cinema of Josef von Sternberg. London: A. Zwemmer / New York: A. S. Barnes & Co.
Cady, Brian. 2004. Mister Roberts (1955). Turner Classic Movies. https://www.tcm.com/tcmdb/title/16883/mister-roberts#articles-reviews?articleId=72472 Retrieved December 30, 2020.
Canham, Kingsley. 1976. The Hollywood Professional, Volume 5: King Vidor, John Cromwell, Mervyn LeRoy. The Tantivy Press, London. 
Carr, Jay. 2014. The World Changes. Turner Classic Movies. https://www.tcm.com/tcmdb/title/511/the-world-changes#articles-reviews?articleId=941261 Retrieved December 12, 2020.
Cox, Amy. 2004. Million Dollar Mermaid. Turner Classic Movies. https://www.tcm.com/tcmdb/title/2584/million-dollar-mermaid#articles-reviews?articleId=70939 Retrieved December 28, 2020.
Flint, Peter B. 1987.  Mervyn LeRoy, 86, Dies; Director and Producer. New York Times. September 14, 1987, https://www.nytimes.com/1987/09/14/obituaries/mervyn-leroy-86-dies-director-and-producer.html Retrieved August 25, 2020.
Fristoe, Roger. 2006. The King and The Chorus Girl. Turner Classic Movies. https://www.tcm.com/tcmdb/title/2572/the-king-and-the-chorus-girl#articles-reviews?articleId=88452 Retierved December 20, 2020.
Fristoe, Robert. 2003. Lovely To Look At. Turner Classic Movies. https://www.tcm.com/tcmdb/title/3260/lovely-to-look-at#articles-reviews?articleId=24013 Retrieved December 27, 2020.
Georgaris, Bill. 2020. Mervyn LeRoy. They Shoot Pictures Don't They (TSPDT). https://www.theyshootpictures.com/leroymervyn.htm Retrieved December 10, 2020.
Higham, Charles and Greenberg, Joel. 1968. Hollywood in the Forties. A.S. Barnes & Co. Inc. Paperback Library, New York. 1970. 
Johnson, Deborah L. 2002. Escape (1940). Turner Classic Movies. https://www.tcm.com/tcmdb/title/2892/escape#articles-reviews?articleId=327 Retrieved December 21, 2020.
Kutner, Jerry C. 2011. Two Seconds to Noirville. Brightlightsfilms.org. February 16, 2011. https://brightlightsfilm.com/two-seconds-to-noirville/#.X6LfeKjYq00 Retrieved November 5, 2020.
Landazuri, Margarita. 2008. Tugboat Annie. Turner Classic Movies. https://www.tcm.com/tcmdb/title/1511/tugboat-annie#articles-reviews?articleId=202410 Retrieved December 11
Landazuri, Margarita. 2003. Waterloo Bridge (1940). Turner Classic Movies. https://www.tcm.com/tcmdb/title/14463/waterloo-bridge#articles-reviews?articleId=24055 Retrieved December 22, 2020.
Landazuri, Margarita. 2008. East Side, West Side. Turner Classics Movies. https://www.tcm.com/tcmdb/title/2214/east-side-west-side#articles-reviews?articleId=202792 Retrieved December 26, 2020.
LeVoit, Violet. 2011. Mary, Mary. Turner Classic Movies. https://www.tcm.com/tcmdb/title/83019/mary-mary#articles-reviews?articleId=409920 Retrieved January 3, 2021.
LeRoy, Mervyn and Kleiner, Dick. 1974. Mervyn LeRoy: Take One. Hawthorn Books, Inc. New York. 
LoBianco, Lorraine. 2014. I Found Stella Parish. Turner Classic Movies. https://www.tcm.com/tcmdb/title/1129/i-found-stella-parish#articles-reviews?articleId=1009645 Retrieved December 13, 2020.
LoBianco, Lorraine. 2009. Latin Lover. Turner Classic Movies. https://www.tcm.com/tcmdb/title/1905/latin-lovers#articles-reviews?articleId=276127 Retrieved December 28, 2020.
Looney, Deborah. 2002. They Won't Forget. Turner Classic Movies. https://www.tcm.com/tcmdb/title/2289/they-wont-forget#articles-reviews?articleId=18606 Retrieved December 14, 2020.
McGee, Scott. 2007. The Green Berets. Turner Classic Movie. https://www.tcm.com/tcmdb/title/21344/the-green-berets#articles-reviews?articleId=88176 Retrieved January 5, 2021.
Miller, Frank. 201 4. Happiness Ahead. Turner Classic Movies. https://www.tcm.com/tcmdb/title/2565/happiness-ahead#articles-reviews?articleId=959582 Retrieved December 12, 2020.
Miller, Frank. 2007. Oil for the Lamps of China. Turner Classic Movies. https://www.tcm.com/tcmdb/title/350/oil-for-the-lamps-of-china#articles-reviews?articleId=88917 Retrieved December 13, 2020
Miller, Frank. 2004. Page Miss Glory. Turner Classic Movies. https://www.tcm.com/tcmdb/title/697/page-miss-glory#articles-reviews?articleId=76323 Retrieved December 11, 2020.
Miller, Frank. 2009. The Essentials – Random Harvest. Turner Classic Movies. https://www.tcm.com/tcmdb/title/2716/random-harvest/#articles-reviews?articleId=71664 Retrieved December 22, 2020.
Miller, Frank. 2011. The Essentials – Thirty Seconds Over Tokyo. Turner Classic Movies. https://www.tcm.com/tcmdb/title/451/thirty-seconds-over-tokyo#articles-reviews?articleId=373459 Retrieved December 24, 2020.
Miller, Frank. 2004. The Bad Seed (1956). Turner Movie Classics. https://www.tcm.com/tcmdb/title/67988/the-bad-seed#articles-reviews?articleId=78406 Retrieved December 31, 2020.
Miller, Frank. 2014. Toward the Unknown. Turner Classic Movies. https://www.tcm.com/tcmdb/title/93724/toward-the-unknown#articles-reviews?articleId=1008869 Retrieved January 1, 2021.
Miller, Frank. 2008. Gypsy. Turner Classic Movies. https://www.tcm.com/tcmdb/title/15879/gypsy#articles-reviews?articleId=198696 Retrieved January 3, 2021.
Niles, Cimo. TMC. Mervyn LeRoy Profile. Turner Classic Movies. http://www.tcm.com/this-month/article/482%7C484/Mervyn-LeRoy-Profile.html Retrieved November 5, 2020.
Nixon, Rob. 2013. The Essentials – Gold Diggers Of 1933. Turner Classic Movies. https://www.tcm.com/tcmdb/title/3463/gold-diggers-of-1933#articles-reviews?articleId=582518 Retrieved December 11, 2020.
Nixon, Rob. 2004. Stand Up And Fight. Turner Classic Movies.https://www.tcm.com/tcmdb/title/3409/stand-up-and-fight#articles-reviews?articleId=81489 Retrieved December 20, 2020.
Passafiume, Andrea. 2007. Madame Curie. Turner Classic Movies. https://www.tcm.com/tcmdb/title/82296/madame-curie#articles-reviews?articleId=74637 Retrieved December 24, 2020.
Passafiume, Andrea. 2011. Rose Marie (1954). Turner Classic Movies. https://www.tcm.com/tcmdb/title/14548/rose-marie#articles-reviews?articleId=413227 Retrieved December 29, 2020.
Passafiume, Andrea. 2008. A Majority of One. Turner Classic Movies. https://www.tcm.com/tcmdb/title/26647/a-majority-of-one#articles-reviews?articleId=198748 Retrieved January 3, 2021.
Passafiume, Andrea. 2008. A Majority of One. Turner Classic Movies. https://www.tcm.com/tcmdb/title/26647/a-majority-of-one#articles-reviews?articleId=198748 Retrieved January 3, 2021.
Reilly, Celia M. 2003. Quo Vadis. Turner Classic Movies. https://www.tcm.com/tcmdb/title/933/quo-vadis#articles-reviews?articleId=59900 Retrieved December 26, 2020.
Sarris, Andrew. 1966. The Films of Josef von Sternberg. New York: Doubleday.
Safford, Jeff. 2005. Five Star Final, TMC. Turner Classic Movies. https://www.tcm.com/tcmdb/title/1664/five-star-final#articles-reviews?articleId=97200 Retrieved December 10, 2020
Smith, Richard Harlan. 2014. The FBI Story. Turner Classic Movies. https://www.tcm.com/tcmdb/title/16097/the-fbi-story#articles-reviews?articleId=963757 Retrieved January 1, 2021.
Stafford, Jeff. 2011. Heat Lighting. Turner Classic Movies. https://www.tcm.com/tcmdb/title/667/heat-lightning#articles-reviews?articleId=411148 Retrieved December 12, 2020.
Sarris, Andrew. 1998. "You Ain't Heard Nothin' Yet." The American Talking Film History & Memory, 1927–1949. Oxford University Press. 
Stafford, Jeff. 2004. The Devil At 4 O'Clock. Turner Classic Movies. https://www.tcm.com/tcmdb/title/72936/the-devil-at-4-oclock/#articles-reviews?articleId=79235 Retrieved January 5, 2021.
Steinberg, Jay S. 2009. Anthony Adverse. Turner Classic Movies. https://www.tcm.com/tcmdb/title/1857/anthony-adverse#articles-reviews?articleId=236452 Retrieved December 15, 2020.
Steinberg, Jay S. 2004. Homecoming. Turner Classic Movies. https://www.tcm.com/tcmdb/title/669/homecoming#articles-reviews?articleId=83989 Retrieved December 25, 2020.
Sterritt, David. 2011. High Pressure, TMC. Turner Classic Movies. https://www.tcm.com/tcmdb/title/2567/high-pressure#articles-reviews?articleId=453747 Retrieved December 10, 2020.
Sterritt, David. 2011. Home Before Dark. Turner Classic Movies. https://www.tcm.com/tcmdb/title/78243/home-before-dark#articles-reviews?articleId=385023 Retrieved January 1, 2021.
Thames, Stephanie. 2007.  Sweet Adeline. Turner Classic Movies. https://www.tcm.com/tcmdb/title/2173/sweet-adeline#articles-reviews?articleId=182351 Retrieved December 7, 2020.
Thames, Stephanie. 2003. Without Reservations. Turner Classic Movies. https://www.tcm.com/tcmdb/title/96061/without-reservations#articles-reviews?articleId=62611 Retrieved 25, 2020.
Whiteley, Chris. 2020. Mervyn LeRoy (1900–1987). Hollywood's Golden Age. http://www.hollywoodsgoldenage.com/moguls/mervyn-leroy.html Retrieved November 8, 2020.
Wood, Bret. 2009. Two Seconds. Turner Classic Movies. Two Seconds Retrieved December 12, 2020.

External links 

 
 
 Mervyn leRoy at Virtual History

1900 births
1987 deaths
20th-century American businesspeople
20th-century American male actors
Actors from Palm Springs, California
American male film actors
American male silent film actors
Jewish American film directors
Jewish American film producers
American racehorse owners and breeders
American writers
Burials at Forest Lawn Memorial Park (Glendale)
Cecil B. DeMille Award Golden Globe winners
Deaths from dementia in California
Deaths from Alzheimer's disease
Film directors from California
Film producers from California
Jewish American writers
Jewish American male actors
Male actors from San Francisco
Vaudeville performers
Warner family
20th-century American Jews